Lianmeng Road Subdistrict is a subdistrict of Xinhua District, Shijiazhuang, Hebei, People's Republic of China. , it has seven residential communities and one village under its administration.

See also
List of township-level divisions of Hebei

References

Township-level divisions of Hebei